is a 2005 action-adventure game developed and published by Capcom for the PlayStation 2. The game was released in Europe and North America in February, and in Japan in March.

The plot is a fictionalized version of the assassination of Julius Caesar, focusing on two characters, Agrippa, a soldier whose father is accused of murdering Caesar, and who is forced to fight in the gladiatorial arenas, and Octavianus, who sets about proving Agrippa's father's innocence.

The game received favorable reviews. Originally conceived as the first part of a franchise aimed at a specifically western audience, the sequel was in the early stages of development when the first game was released. However, due to poor sales, particularly in North America, executive producer Keiji Inafune decided to scrap the franchise, and Shadow of Rome 2 ultimately became Dead Rising.

Gameplay
Shadow of Rome is an action-adventure game played from a third-person perspective. The game features two forms of combat; melee-combat which involves close combat with melee weapons, and vehicular combat that comes in the form of chariot racing. Stealth gameplay is also included alongside rudimentary puzzle-solving.

During combat, the player character is Agrippa, who can use various gladiatorial weapons such as swords, scimitars, maces, spears, bows, slingshots and flails. If Agrippa has severed the arm of an enemy, he can pick it up and also use it as a weapon. However, weapons can only be used for a certain amount of time before they break. During combat, a meter indicates the remaining vitality of Agrippa's weapon(s) and helmet (if he has one equipped). Agrippa can attack with his main weapon, his sub-weapon or shield, or with a two-handed weapon. The player can lock on to enemies to make Agrippa target them. Agrippa can also throw weapons at his enemies, and can fight with his fists, using strong and soft punches as well as shoulder tackles. If timed correctly, Agrippa can also steal weapons from his enemies, or knock their weapons out of their hands using a shoulder tackle. He can also attack from the ground by flinging sand into an approaching enemy's face, and he can attack downed enemies by stomping on them or stabbing them. If Agrippa stands behind a groggy enemy he can perform a suplex on them.

An important aspect of the combat gameplay are "SALVO points." Salvos are specific actions or combinations of actions which excite the crowd. When Agrippa performs a salvo action, he is awarded salvo points, which fill up the salvo bar. If Agrippa calls for the attention of the crowd when the bar is full, the audience will throw him rare and powerful weapons. If he calls for their attention when it is not full, they will throw normal weapons, shields, food, or often, nothing at all. At the end of each arena battle, Agrippa will be given a ranking based on the total number of salvo points he achieved in that battle.

The other component of Agrippa's sections in the game involves chariot racing. In this mode, Agrippa must race against other chariots, and can win by either crossing the finish line first, or eliminating all of his opponents, either by killing them or destroying their chariots. Agrippa can whip his horses to give a speed boost, but doing so drains the horses stamina gauge. When it is empty, the horses can only run at normal speed, until the gauge begins to fill up again. Agrippa can eliminate opponents by driving alongside their chariots and attacking them or by forcing their chariots into obstacles. Longer weapons can be found on the track itself, carried by slaves.

In Octavianus' stealth levels, the player must use stealth to navigate various locations in Rome. Octavianus cannot kill enemies, he can only knock them out by hitting them from behind with objects such as vases, choking them with ropes or placing banana peels in front of them. Once he has done so, he often has to drag their body into hiding to make sure other enemies don't find it. Other ways to avoid enemies are by hiding in large pots, or by stealing clothes and impersonating guards or other people. During these levels, there is an alert gauge which appears when Octavianus is spotted by an enemy. The gauge gradually empties over time if he is out of sight, and once it is completely empty, enemies stop looking for him. Octavianus can also distract enemies by throwing items such as stones and by whistling. Even if Octavianus is disguised, enemies can become suspicious of him if he does anything unusual, such as running, standing still for no reason, or trying to open locked doors. Often, enemies will stop him and question him. The player will be presented with a series of choices to try to assuage the guards' suspicions. If the player picks the wrong answer, Octavianus' disguise will fail, and he will be killed. Octavianus is also able to listen to conversations in locked rooms by peeking through keyholes. During levels where he must follow someone, he has a "Tail Gauge." When the person he is following is out of his sight, the gauge starts to empty, and when it is fully depleted he is adjudged to have lost the person he was tailing and the game is over.

Plot

The game begins as the Roman army, under the command of centurion Agrippa (voiced by Rick Weiss), is fighting a Germanic army in the northeastern provinces. In Rome, Julius Caesar (Michael Bell) is on his way to the Senate when he is stabbed. As he dies, he looks at his killer and says "Et tu, Brute?" As he is cremated in the Foro Romano, Cicero (Peter Renaday) reveals the assassin to the public; Vipsanius (Daniel Riordan), Agrippa's father. As Vipsanius maintains his innocence, Cicero announces Caesar's successor, Antonius (Chris Cox). Listening from the crowd, Octavianus (Scott Menville), Caesar's nephew, refuses to believe Vipsanius is guilty. Meanwhile, in Germania, Agrippa receives word of Caesar's death, and orders his men to return to Rome.

Soon after the funeral, Octavianus meets Pansa (Jack Angel), formerly Caesar's most trusted spy. With Pansa's help, Octavianus sneaks into the Senate where Maecenas (Larry Cedar), Antonius' secretary, proposes that rather than immediately executing Vipsanius, they hold a gladiatorial tournament across the Empire, the winner of which will perform the execution. Antonius approves of the idea, but dictates that Vipsania (Moira Quirk), Vipsanius' wife, be publicly executed immediately. Agrippa arrives back in Rome, and Octavianus explains the situation. At the execution, presided over by Decius Brutus (Daniel Riordan), Agrippa attempts to save Vipsania, but as they flee, she is stabbed in the back by Decius, who then defeats Agrippa in combat. However, before Agrippa can be arrested, he and Octavianus are saved by a woman on a chariot. She reveals her name is Claudia (Nicole Balick), a female gladiator. She tells them about the gladiatorial tournament, and that her brother, Sextus (Roger Rose) runs a gladiator camp which Agrippa could join to gain entry to the tournament and possibly save his father. Meanwhile, Octavianus will remain in Rome and investigate the murder.

As Agrippa fights his way through the tournament, Octavianus begins to follow Cicero's protégé, Marcus Brutus (Cam Clarke). At the camp, Claudia tells Agrippa she and Sextus are not brother and sister; he rescued her as a child after her brother was killed by a Roman soldier. Meanwhile, Sextus is visited by Iris (Heather Halley) and Charmian (Jennifer Hale), who come with "a direct order from our mistress." They want Sextus to assassinate someone, in return for their mistress aiding his plans. Sextus agrees. In Rome, Octavianus finds Cicero stabbed in his office. The dying Cicero tells him a group of conspirators are responsible for Caesar's assassination, and Vipsanius is innocent. Marcus is a member of the group, but the actual murderer is "another Brutus." Meanwhile, Agrippa makes it to the finals of the tournament in the Colosseum. Octavianus heads to meet Marcus, where he finds multiple senators murdered, and a distraught Marcus, who says the other Brutus is killing off the members of the conspiracy. However, he refuses to reveal his identity.

At the camp, Claudia tells Agrippa Sextus is really the son of Pompeius, who was killed in battle by Caesar. She explains he plans to assassinate Octavianus (Caesar's only surviving blood relative) in order to gain support for his conquest of Rome. Meanwhile, Octavianus finds a note in Caesar's handwriting speculating as to the worthiness of possible successors, and learns that Antonius was not his chosen heir. At the camp, Sextus abruptly disappears along with a number of gladiators, and Claudia learns he is working for Iris and Charmian. In Rome, Sextus confronts Octavianus, and is about to kill him when Claudia intervenes. Octavianus flees, and witnesses Decius stabbing Marcus. A dying Marcus tells Octavianus that Decius is the "other Brutus." Maecenas then has Octavianus arrested.

In the final of the tournament, Agrippa faces Decius, whom he defeats and is about to kill him when Maecenas arrives in the arena, announcing the return of Caesar. He explains the man killed was a decoy employed because Caesar knew about the conspiracy, announcing the murder was carried out by Decius, not Vipsanius. Caesar arrives and addresses Antonius, telling him he did not chose him as his heir. Iris and Charmian revealed Caesar's true choice to Antonius, who masterminded the conspiracy. A shocked Antonius admits his guilt, at which point Maecenas reveals Caesar really is dead, and the man pretending to be him is his true chosen heir - Octavianus. A furious Antonius orders Decius to kill Octavianus, but Agrippa intervenes and kills Decius. At that moment, however, Rome is attacked by Sextus, supported by soldiers loyal to Antonius, who is able to escape the arena. Agrippa and Claudia head to Ostia and confront Sextus. Agrippa defeats him and begs him to surrender. However, Antonius attacks the docks, and Sextus sacrifices himself to save Claudia. As a battle rages at sea between those loyal to Octavianus and those loyal to Antonius, Agrippa faces Antonius, whom he defeats and kills.

Back in Rome, Agrippa, Octavianus and Claudia mourn Sextus. She tells them she is leaving Rome, but will keep her eye on things. As she leaves, Agrippa asks her to promise she will return, but she doesn't answer him. Octavianus then vows to fulfill Caesar's dream of the Pax Romana, with Agrippa vowing to help him any way he can. In the epilogue, a content Iris and Charmian state it is time to tell their mistress they have "reached the end of the beginning."

Development

Shadow of Rome was first revealed on January 28, 2004, when Capcom announced the plot would revolve around the assassination of Julius Caesar. Using an enhanced version of the Onimusha 3 game engine, and developed by the same team, under the guidance of executive producer Keiji Inafune, the game was announced as exclusive to the PlayStation 2. Capcom explained it would have two parallel stories and two different styles of gameplay; action and stealth. In his first look at the game, GameSpot's Ricardo Torres wrote

At this stage in development, the game featured a semi-branching storyline, whereby if the player excelled at the stealth sections, there would be more levels based around stealth, whereas if they were good at combat, more combat levels would feature.

The game was next shown at the E3 event in May, where a playable demo was made available, with one Agrippa level and one Octavianus level. Capcom explained the game was specifically designed for North American and European markets, and although release dates for both markets had been set, they were unsure if the game would get a release in Japan as it was not tailored for the Japanese market. The game was next shown at the Tokyo Game Show in September. A near complete build was sent to gaming websites in January 2005, when it was revealed the branching system had been removed and the game now followed a linear level-by-level progression system.

Reception

 
Shadow of Rome received "generally favorable reviews." It holds an aggregate score of 75 out of 100 on Metacritic, based on fifty-two reviews.
 
Eurogamer's Kristan Reed scored the game 6 out of 10, calling it "one of those frustrating 'nearly' games that could and should have been brilliant." He praised the concept of mixing two gameplay styles; "it would be easy to get stuck in a rut as a gaming experience if you were constantly engaged in a blistering hack-and-slash the whole time. Likewise, a pure stealth experience would soon feel restrictive and frustrating." However, he felt the stealth sections were underdeveloped, arguing "they're just never that enjoyable on a basic level," and calling them "tedious, exacting, basic and inconsistent." However, he was also critical of the action sections, calling them "blister inducing," and arguing "the same tactics get you through every time." He ultimately concluded "there's something oddly soulless about [the game]."
 
Game Revolution's Joe Dodson scored the game a C, arguing the mixing of gameplay styles was  poorly executed; "Most games include stealth and action mechanics so that the player can choose how to approach a situation, but in Shadow of Rome, Octavianus cannot fight at all and Agrippa is about as stealthy as a hippo on PCP." He also  found the combat system shallow; "Agrippa's gameplay heavily relies on the X button. There are all sorts of special names for the crazy stuff he can do, but most of it requires one button press." He concluded, "despite its grandiose subject matter, Shadow of Rome is merely a bad stealth game chained to a limited action game."
 
GameSpy's Bryn Williams scored the game 3.5 out of 5, writing it "oozes potential but ultimately fails to deliver greatness." He called the stealth levels "distinctly bland, and above all else, poorly designed." He was also critical of the voice acting and the cutscenes, and concluded "the overall theme and premise of Shadow of Rome ends up coming across as a missed opportunity for gaming greatness. The pacing is thrown out of whack on a regular basis due to the crippled stealth elements."
 
IGN's Ed Lewis scored it 7.6 out of 10, calling the action sections "pretty damn satisfying." However, although he didn't dislike the stealth sections, he felt "neither side of the game [...] is complex enough or [has] enough detail to make them something to want to dig into." He concluded, "put both these elements of the game together and the result is the equivalent of a summer action flick with a decent plot."
 
GameSpot's Greg Kasavin scored the game 8.2 out of 10, praising the "intriguing storyline and great-looking cinematic cutscenes." He felt it "successfully combines two distinctly different types of gameplay [...] Feature for feature, there's nothing hugely original about Shadow of Rome, but its combination of different elements is definitely unique, its characters are expressive and fun to watch, and the quality of its presentation is right up there with the best of what the PlayStation 2 has to offer." He concluded "Shadow of Rome offers some of the best hack-and-slash combat out there and wraps it up in an interesting story that puts an original spin on the whole Julius Caesar-getting-murdered thing. It's also got plenty of gameplay variety to keep you motivated from start to finish, and it's always pretty to look at."

Cancelled sequels
Although originally conceived as the first part of a franchise aimed specifically at Western markets, Shadow of Rome did not sell well in either North America or Europe (entering the UK PlayStation 2 charts at #5), and ultimately, Capcom considered it a failure. Shadow of Rome 2 was already in early development prior to the release of the first game, but after the poor sales, executive producer Keiji Inafune chose to abandon the project, and Shadow of Rome 2 ultimately became Dead Rising.

Notes

References

External links
 

2005 video games
Action-adventure games
Capcom games
Cultural depictions of Augustus
Depictions of Julius Caesar in video games
PlayStation 2 games
PlayStation 2-only games
Single-player video games
Video games about gladiatorial combat
Video games developed in Japan
Video games scored by Yoshino Aoki
Video games set in antiquity
Video games set in the Roman Empire